Dihydrochandonium is an aminosteroid non-depolarizing neuromuscular blocking agent.

References

Muscle relaxants
Nicotinic antagonists
Quaternary ammonium compounds
Steroids
Neuromuscular blockers